Roel Vermeulen (born October 14, 1970, in Made, Netherlands) is a Dutch scientist and professor at Utrecht University and University Medical Center Utrecht, the Netherlands in the field of environmental epidemiology and exposome. His scientific research focuses on environmental risk factors for cancer and neurological diseases, with a strong emphasis on the integration of epidemiology, high-quality exposure assessment and molecular biology in multidisciplinary studies.

Biography 
Roel Vermeulen studied Environmental science at Wageningen University and Research and received his PhD degree in 2001 from the Utrecht University. He spent six years researching the relationship between environmental factors, molecular changes and the development of cancer at the National Cancer Institute. In 2006, he returned to Utrecht University. In 2017 Roel Vermeulen was appointed to the post of Professor of Environmental Epidemiology and Exposome Analysis at the Faculty of Veterinary Medicine and University Medical Center Utrecht (UMCU) Vermeulen is director of the Institute for Risk Assessment Sciences (IRAS) and one of the initiators of the Data- and Knowledge Hub Healthy Urban Living (DKH HUL) in the Netherlands. He also holds a visiting professorship at the Imperial College London.

Roel Vermeulen has served on international committees including the World Health Organization and the National Toxicology Program in the US. Between 2009 and 2021 he was a member of the Health Council in the Netherlands and currently heads the consortium Exposome-NL funded with a Dutch Research Council Gravitation Grant  and the European research project EXPANSE, funded with a European Horizon 2020 Grant. He is also coordinator of the Utrecht Exposome Hub. In 2021 Roel Vermeulen held the Utrecht University’s annual Anniversary Address.

Honours and awards 
 Alice Hamilton award (2013)
 Charles C. Shepard Science Award (2012)
 Thomas Bedford Memorial Prize (2011/2012)

References

External links 
  Website of the Institute for Risk Assessment Sciences (IRAS)
  Website of Exposome-NL
  Website of EXPANSE

1970 births
Living people
Dutch biologists
Dutch epidemiologists
Wageningen University and Research alumni
Academic staff of Utrecht University